Ericoideae is a subfamily of Ericaceae, containing nineteen genera, and 1,790 species, the largest of which is Rhododendron, followed by Erica. The Ericoideae bear spiral leaves with flat laminae. The pedicel is articulated and the flowers are pendulous or erect, and monosymmetric, with an abaxial median sepal. The carpels are free and the anthers lack appendages. The capsule is septicidal.

Subdivision 
, the NCBI Taxonomy Browser recognized five tribes:
 Tribe Bryantheae
 Genera: Bryanthus – Ledothamnus
 Tribe Empetreae
 Genera: Ceratiola – Corema – Empetrum (plus Diplarche, treated as a synonym of Rhododendron by Plants of the World Online)
 Tribe Ericeae
 Genera: Calluna – Daboecia – Erica (plus Bruckenthalia, treated as a synonym of Erica by Plants of the World Online)
 Tribe Phyllodoceae
 Genera: Bejaria – Elliottia – Epigaea – Kalmia – Kalmiopsis – Phyllodoce – Rhodothamnus (plus the artificial hybrid genera × Kalmiothamnus and × Phyllothamnus)
 Tribe Rhodoreae
 Genera: Rhododendron (plus Menziesia and Therorhodion, treated as synonyms of Rhododendron by Plants of the World Online)

List of genera:
 Bejaria
 Bryanthus
 Calluna
 Ceratiola
 Corema
 Daboecia
 Elliottia
 Empetrum
 Epigaea
 Erica
 Kalmia
 Kalmiopsis
 Ledothamnus
 Phyllodoce
 Rhododendron
 Rhodothamnus

References

External links 
 NCBI Taxonomy: Ericoideae
 K A Kron. Ericoideae. Wake Forest University

 
Asterid subfamilies